Braddell Heights Single Member Constituency was a constituency in Singapore. It existed from 1976 to 1997 and was merged into Marine Parade Group Representation Constituency in 1997. It merged parts of Serangoon Gardens, Thomson, Upper Serangoon, Aljunied and Paya Lebar constituencies together.

Member of Parliament

Elections

Elections in 1970s

Elections in 1980s

Elections in 1990s

References

Singaporean electoral divisions
Serangoon